Carmel was an ancient Israelite town in Judea, lying about  from Hebron, on the southeastern frontier of Mount Hebron.

In the Hebrew Bible
There are several references to Carmel in the Bible. It is mentioned as the place where Saul erects a monument after the expedition against the Amalekites. Beside the agricultural importance of the site, Carmel had also a strategic importance because of it containing the only reliable natural spring of water in the immediate area, which waters are collected in a man-made pool. Carmel, in relation to Maon, lies directly to its north, within close proximity.

Roman and Byzantine period

Mentioned in Eusebius' Onomasticon as a village "10 milestones east  of Hebron," the village housed a Roman garrison after the Bar Kochba revolt. The Jewish settlement is thought to have prospered until the Persian army of Chosroes forced the Roman garrison of Heraclius' army to leave Palestine. With a lack of market for their wine, the Jewish settlement declined, with the synagogue finally being abandoned in the 9th century. 

In the Byzantine era, around the 6th or 7th century CE, a church was built here, on the western side of the remains. Outlines of a further two churches were uncovered to the immediate north and south.

The abandoned synagogue, which still stands in the Palestinian town now known as al-Karmil, is one of the best preserved ancient synagogues in the West Bank.

Crusade period
During the period of the Crusades in the 12-century CE, a castle was built at Carmel under the command of Renaud of Châtillon. William of Tyre mentions Carmel as the camp of King Amalric in 1172.

References

Bibliography

 
 
 
 
 
 
 Kuhnen, H-P., Studien zur Chronologie und Siedlungsarchaologie des Karmel (Israel) zwischen Hellenismus und Spatantike (Wiesbaden, 1989).
 Lozovyy, Joseph. (2006). Saul, Doeg, Nabal and the "Son of Jesse": Readings in 1 Samuel 16-25. Ph.D. Thesis at the University of Edinburgh

External links
Survey of Western Palestine, Map 21:    IAA, Wikimedia commons (el-Kurmul shown on bottom part of map)

Hebrew Bible cities
District of Hebron
Judea (Roman province)
Ancient Jewish settlements of Judaea
Crusade places
Biblical geography
Ancient villages in Israel
Ancient Jewish history